Tri-City Medical Center (Tri-City or TCMC), founded in 1961, is a full-service, acute-care public hospital in Oceanside, California. Located 40 miles north of San Diego, Tri-City serves three major cities in the North County section of San Diego County: Oceanside, Vista, and Carlsbad. The hospital also owns and operates nearby outpatient services, as well as the Tri-City Health and Wellness Complex in Carlsbad, home to the Tri-City Wellness Center, a 58,000-square-foot medically integrated training facility.

TCMC is administered by the Tri-City Healthcare District, a Health District of California.

History

The Tri-City Medical Center was founded in 1961 after voters elected to form the Tri-City Hospital District, approving a bond issue to pay for the cost of land and construction. At the time, northern San Diego County was a rural area with little medical infrastructure, and community leaders from Carlsbad, Oceanside, and Vista knew the region needed a modern local hospital in order to grow. The finished product, originally named the Tri-City Hospital, was the outcome of their labor.

When Tri-City Medical Center first opened, it was a relatively small facility, with only 42 physicians on staff; as North County's population continued to grow, it quickly became apparent that the hospital would need to expand. In the 1970s, responding to demand, Tri-City added a cardiopulmonary lab, additional surgical suites, and a 42-bed maternity unit. In the 1980s, the hospital expanded further, adding a four-story wing and remodeling existing facilities. It also increased its range of services, creating a mental health unit and a dialysis center, and began providing cardiac rehabilitation. By the time Tri-City Hospital changed its name to Tri-City Medical Center in 1985, the hospital had also developed a magnetic resonance imaging center, a neonatal intensive care unit, and an updated emergency department.

Medical Specialties

As a full-service public hospital, Tri-City Medical Center provides a wide range of healthcare services, including behavioral health services, home health care, and rehabilitation services.  The following services, however, are considered to be its medical specialties:

 Cancer: Accredited by the American College of Surgeons Commission on Cancer, Tri-City's cancer service provides chemotherapy, hormone therapy, immune or targeted therapy, and radiation therapy treatment. In 2016, Tri-City Medical Center became one of the first hospitals in San Diego County to offer intraoperative radiation therapy for patients with early-stage breast cancer.
 Emergency Services: The TCMC Emergency Department contains a San Diego County designated Heart Attack Receiving Center, as well a Joint Commission designated Primary Stroke Receiving Center. The department provides 41 beds for critical injuries and illnesses, as well as six beds for less severe illnesses and injuries.
 Heart Care: Tri-City Medical Center's Cardiovascular Health Institute provides cardiothoracic surgery, interventional radiology, and vascular surgery, among other cardiological services. The recipient of the Joint Commission's Gold Seal of Approval for Primary Stroke Centers, the institute also became, in 2009, the first nationally accredited Chest Pain Center in San Diego County.
 NICU: Tri-City Medical Center has the second largest neonatal intensive care unit in San Diego County (second only to Rady Children's Hospital), and is the only Level III NICU located in North County San Diego.
 Orthopedics: TCMC's Orthopaedic and Spine Institute performs hip, knee, and shoulder replacements, as well as laminectomies and spinal fusions, among other orthopaedic procedures. In July 2012, Tri-City became the first hospital in San Diego County to perform a Vitamin E Total Knee Replacement.
 Robotic Surgery: Tri-City uses robotic systems to perform a number of surgical procedures, and is the only hospital in San Diego County with more than one such system: the hospital implements the Da Vinci Surgical System to perform select procedures in general surgery, gynecology, heart care, orthopaedics, and urology; the Mazor Robotic Renaissance System to perform select spinal surgeries; the Navio Surgical System to perform partial knee replacements.
 Women's Care: Tri-City offers pregnancy support through a childbirth center, programs and classes. The hospital also provides women's health services including mammogram screenings.

Research

Tri-City Medical Center performs more than 20 clinical research studies a year, often in close affiliation with the University of California, San Diego medical staff. TCMC also conducts research in partnership with independent physicians and practices, regional pediatric care facilities, primary care facilities, and outpatient treatment satellites.

The hospital's research currently focuses in the following areas: breast cancer, cardiovascular disease, cellulitis, endocrinology, hematology / oncology, hepatology; infection, mental health, pneumonia, and stroke.

Facilities and Current Operations

Tri-City Medical Center's main campus is located at 4002 Vista Way in Oceanside, California. Its fitness complex, better known as Tri-City Wellness Center is located at 6250 El Camino Real in Carlsbad. The 58,000 square foot facility is an integrated wellness campus that sets the stage for an environment focused on total well-being, ranging from day-to-day health maintenance to sports performance training and rehabilitation. Currently, two service lines, Physical Therapy and Cardiac Rehabilitation operate within the facility.

Adjacent to Tri-City Wellness Center, located at 6260 El Camino Real, is the award-winning Center for Wound Care & Hyperbaric Medicine. Together, the hospital system has a partnership with more than 700 physicians and handles nearly 200,000 outpatient visitors a year, about 17,000 of whom are admitted.

The hospital's 388 licensed beds are utilized to a wide variety of ends. Tri-City treats around 92,000 patients a year on an outpatient basis and over 70,000 patients a year through its 24-hour Emergency Department. Tri-City also delivers nearly 2,600 babies a year.

TCMC has been expanding its facilities in order to increase its range of services. In recent years, Tri-City has built the Orthopaedic and Spine Institute (2011), the Cardiovascular Health Institute (2010), the Tri-City Medical Office Building in Carlsbad (2010), the Tri-City Wellness Center (2009), and the Center for Wound Care and Hyperbaric Medicine (2008).

UC San Diego Health and Tri-City Healthcare District finalized in August 2016 an agreement between the two organizations, entering into an affiliation designed to provide expanded health care to patients in North San Diego County.

Community Involvement

Tri-City Medical Center sponsors the annual Carlsbad Marathon & Half Marathon. In 2016, this event featured nearly 7,000 participants from 47 states and 30 countries.

In 2016, Tri-City Medical Center announced a three-year partnership with the American Heart Association to sponsor an annual heart walk in Oceanside, California, starting in September 2017.

Leadership

Board of Directors
 Leigh Anne Grass, RN, BSN, PHN - Chairperson
 Larry Schallock - Vice Chairperson
 Julie Nygaard - Secretary
 RoseMarie V. Reno - Treasurer
 Rocky J. Chavez -  Board Member 
 George W. Coulter - Assistant Treasurer
 Tracy M. Younger - Assistant Secretary

Executive Management Team
 Steven Dietlin - Chief Executive Officer 
 Scott Livingstone - Chief Operating Officer
 Ray Rivas - Chief Financial Officer
 Candice Parras, RN – Chief Patient Care Services Officer
 Gene Ma, MD, FACEP – Chief Medical Officer
 Aaron Byzak – Chief External Affairs Officer
 Roger Cortez - Chief Compliance Officer
 Susan Bond, Esq., LL.M., R.N. - General Counsel

References

External links 
 
 This hospital in the CA Healthcare Atlas A project by OSHPD
 Tri-City Wellness Center

Hospital buildings completed in 1961
Hospitals in San Diego County, California
Oceanside, California